Almere is a planned city and municipality in the province of Flevoland, Netherlands across the IJmeer from Amsterdam. 

Bordering Lelystad and Zeewolde, the municipality of Almere comprises six official areas that are the districts of Almere Stad (which is further split up into Almere Stad Oost, Almere Stad West and Almere Centrum), Almere Buiten and Almere Pampus (which is currently being designed), and the boroughs of Almere Haven, Almere Hout and Almere Poort. Four of them feature official district or borough offices. Furthermore, it also comprises the unofficial historic district and neighborhood Oostvaardersdiep, which has an active semi-self-governing community, and the planned district of Almere Oosterwold. Almere is part of the Amsterdam Metropolitan Area (MRA).

Almere is the newest city in the Netherlands: the land on which the city sits, the Southern Flevoland polder, was reclaimed from the IJsselmeer from 1959 to 1968. The first house was finished in 1976, and Almere became a municipality in 1984. It has the largest population of the municipalities in Flevoland with
In October 2007, the city council of Almere made agreements with the government to expand the city to 350,000 inhabitants by 2030.

History
The original plans for the IJsselmeerpolders saw the land being used for agriculture. However, after World War II housing was needed for the rapidly growing population of Amsterdam and two towns were planned in the polders Oostelijk Flevoland and Zuidelijk Flevoland. The town in Oostelijk Flevoland became Lelystad. The town in Zuidelijk Flevoland was still called Zuidweststad (English: South West City) on the first sketches, but in the 1970s it became called Almere, named after the lake Almere, the early medieval name of the Zuiderzee. The first house in Almere was finished in 1976. At that time the town was still controlled by the Openbaar Lichaam Zuidelijke IJsselmeerpolders (Z.IJ.P.), with a Landdrost. In 1984 Almere became an official municipality. Originally, Almere was envisioned as a town with multiple centres. This idea was later abandoned in favor of allowing neighbourhoods like Tussen de Vaarten to be built. There is also a difference between the way houses are built in the oldest and the newest parts of the city. The housing plan in Almere in the 1970s was basic functionality and a levelling of social status. However, starting in the 1990s more exclusive homes with striking designs were built (notably in the Regenboogbuurt).

Governance

Local executive
Ank Bijleveld (CDA) has been serving as acting mayor of Almere since 17 January 2022. Following the Dutch municipal elections, 2014 the current municipal council was inaugurated. The nationalist Party for Freedom had won the most seats in the local elections, which was both national and international news due to the controversial statements of its leader Geert Wilders. Despite this PVV plurality, the party did not join the municipal administration.

List of mayors
 1984–1986: Han Lammers (PvdA)
 1986–1993: Cees de Cloe (PvdA)
 1993–1994: Cees Roozemond (PvdA, acting)
 1994–1998: Ralph Pans (PvdA)
 1998–2003: Hans Ouwerkerk (PvdA)
 2003–2003: Jaap van der Doef (PvdA, acting)
 2003–2015: Annemarie Jorritsma (VVD)
 2015–2022: Franc Weerwind (D66)
 2022–present: Ank Bijleveld (CDA, acting)

Municipal council
The first municipal council was installed on 2 January 1984 in the presence of the then-Minister of the Interior Koos Rietkerk. The council elections took place on 21 September 1983. Prior to 1984 Almere had an Adviesraad, which was chosen every 2 years (1978–1980, 1980–1982, 1982–1984). This Adviesraad was made up of different political parties similar to a local council. On 11 March 1977 the first adviescommissie was elected. It consisted of 5 people that were chosen on personal title.
Since 2018, the council of Almere has comprised a total of 45 members.

International relations

Twin cities
Almere maintains international relations with the following twin cities:

Geography

Almere is located in the polder of Southern Flevoland (Dutch: Zuidelijk Flevoland). It is the most western municipality of the province Flevoland. It borders with Markermeer in the west and north, Lelystad in the northeast, Zeewolde in the east, and Gooimeer in the south.

Almere consists of three boroughs and three districts (Dutch: stadsdelen), three of which are under construction.

Climate

Almere has an oceanic climate characterized by mild to cool winters, and warm summers with fair precipitation year-round.

Demography

Inhabitants by origin

Total population

Culture

On 19 May 2004, at the instigation of Kees Kousemaker, owner of the Amsterdam comics store Lambiek, the first buildings of the  Stripheldenbuurt were inaugurated in Almere. This is a district where all street names are named after famous comics characters and cartoonists.

Sport

Almere is the home of football team Almere City FC, American football team FlevoPhantoms and the home of professional basketball team the Almere Sailors.

Transport

The traffic infrastructure in Almere is recognisable because of its
separate infrastructure for cycles (which, in most cases, have separate cycle paths), cars
and buses (the buses drive on a separate bus lane in most parts of the city).
Almere is connected to the motorways A6 and A27.

Railway
In 1987 Almere was connected to the national railway system (see
NS) with the fully completed
Flevolijn which connected Weesp to Lelystad Centrum.

Almere currently has six railway stations:
Almere Poort (opened December 9, 2012)
Almere Muziekwijk (opened May 30, 1987)
Almere Centrum (opened May 30, 1987)
Almere Parkwijk (opened on February 1, 1996)
Almere Buiten (opened May 30, 1987)
Almere Oostvaarders (opened December 12, 2004)

A seasonal-use station, Almere Strand, was set up for certain events, such as Libelle Zomerweek. The station was made up of iron platforms. It was opened in May 1996 under the name Muiderzand. The station was closed after June 1996 but re-opened in June 1999 under the name Muiderstrand and closed again in July 1999. It re-opened again in 2001 under the name Almere Strand as an official seasonal-use station, meaning it was now open certain seasons every year. Because of the rapid development of the adjacent borough Almere Poort, it was decided to open an official station there (see Almere Poort), thus making the station of Almere Strand obsolete. Almere Poort station opened on December 9, 2012. Therefore, Almere Strand station was officially closed just after the summer of 2012 and its iron platforms were torn down in the weekend of October 6–7, 2012. There are no remains of the station, although passengers can still see where the platforms once stood from the windows of Flevolijn trains.

Public buses

Local bus lines
In Almere there are 11 bus lines which service the urban area.

Monday to Friday, most city buses run about every 5 minutes (10 times every hour) during daytime hours. Saturdays, only a few city bus lines run every 7,5 minutes during daytime hours; most of them run every 12–15 minutes. Sunday, most of the city buses run every 15 minutes (with some buses running extra runs during certain hours) and M6 which only runs every 30 minutes.

There are a few overnight bus lines (Mon-Sat nights only): N21, N22 and N23. They run under the Keolis internal name nightGo (but are operated by R-net branded regional buses).

The bus company running almost all buses is Keolis Netherlands. Local buses (city buses) run under the name allGo. In the buses one can use the national transportation chipcard (smart card), subscriptions or one can buy bus tickets of allGo in the bus or at TVM's (the latter only Downtown).

Regional bus lines
Besides the local bus lines, there are regional and rush hour bus lines to towns and cities in the area.

Line 159 is operated by the bus company Connexxion.

Since April 2012, there was a rush hour route, 150, to Utrecht which connected Almere directly with the University Area of Utrecht called De Uithof. (This was previously done by former bus line 295). Due to budget cuts, line 150 was scrapped on July 9, 2016.

Notable residents

 Rob Verlinden, (born 1950) a Dutch gardener, TV presenter on gardening
 Annemarie Jorritsma, (born 1950), politician and former mayor of Almere
 Bart van Leeuwen, (1950 – 2017) a Dutch photographer, author and radio DJ
 Jörgen Raymann, (born 1966) cabaretier, stand-up comedian, actor, presenter and RTV host
 Chris Jansen, (born 1966) politician
 Raymzter, (born 1979) rapper
 Danny Masseling, (born 1981) known as Angerfist, producer and DJ
 Yfke Sturm (born 1981), international model
 Ali B (born 1981), rapper, show host presenter, music label owner
 Alvaro (born 1987), Producer, DJ
 Pieter Elbers (born 1970), CEO KLM

Sport 
 Frank Rijkaard, (born 1962) football player and coach
 Remy Bonjasky, (born 1976) kickboxer
 Maartje Scheepstra (born 1980) a Dutch field hockey player, silver medallist at the 2004 Summer Olympics
 Marco Piqué (born 1980) a Dutch-Surinamese welterweight kickboxer
 Hedwiges Maduro (born 1985), footballer, over 250 club caps
 Danny Holla (born 1987), footballer with over 300 club caps
 Michaëlla Krajicek (born 1989) a Dutch tennis player
 Desiree van Lunteren (born 1992) a Dutch footballer
 Niki Wories (born 1996) a Dutch figure skater
 Sergiño Dest (born 2000) a Dutch / American footballer

See also
 Floriade 2022

References

External links

Gemeente Almere (official website)
 Geheugen van Almere (people's stories about Almere)
Oldest location in Almere

 
Cities in the Netherlands
Municipalities of Flevoland
Populated places in Flevoland
Populated places established in 1976
Planned cities
New towns
New towns started in the 1970s